State Route 226 (SR-226) is a state highway in the U.S. state of Utah, connecting the Snowbasin ski resort with SR-167.

Route description
SR-226 begins at the entrance to Snowbasin, which is located on the east slope of the Wasatch Range near Mount Ogden in the Uinta-Wasatch-Cache National Forest. It heads south and ascends slightly to the former main entrance (now overflow parking), where it curves east and follows the north slope of the ridge that separates the Ogden and Weber River watersheds, slowly descending to the end at SR-167 (New Trappers Loop Road). The road is two lanes with wide shoulders.

History
The state legislature created SR-226 in 1941, two years after Snowbasin opened. The initial route descended the mountain to the northeast with a number of hairpin curves, ending at SR-39 southwest of Huntsville in the Ogden Valley. A second route - State Route 227 - was to split from SR-226 and follow Wheeler Creek northwest to SR-39 near the Pineview Dam, creating a shortcut between the Wasatch Front and Snowbasin, but this was never built and was removed from the state highway system in 1953. In order to provide better access to the resort for the 2002 Winter Olympics, the state built a new access road from SR-167 (itself recent construction) west to Snowbasin, transferring the old road (except where incorporated into the new road, between the old and new main entrances) to Weber County in 2001.

Major intersections

References

226
 226